Općevac is a village in the municipality Čazma, Bjelovar-Bilogora County in Croatia. According to the 2011 census, there are 116 inhabitants.

References

Populated places in Bjelovar-Bilogora County